In Poland, copyright is regulated by the act from 1994.

The first Polish copyright law act has been enacted in 1926 (although copyright issues have been regulated on territories of partitioned Poland in the 19th century by governments of the German Empire, the Russian Empire and Austro-Hungary, beginning with the 1828 copyright law passed in Tsarist Russia). Poland signed the Berne Convention in 1919, soon after regaining its independence in 1918.

The main acts that have regulated Polish copyright law have been:
Polish Copyright Law from 1926 (Polish original, amended version from 1935) (Dz.U. RP 1935; Pos. 260)
Polish Copyright Law from 1926 (Polish original, amended in 1952) (Dz.U.52.34.234)
Polish Copyright Law from 4 February 1994 (Polish original) (Dz. U. nr 80 z 2000r. poz. 904)
Polish Copyright Law from 4 February 1994 (English)

Polish copyright law complies to a large extent with legislation in European Union, see EU Copyright Directive.

According to the Art.3 of copyright law of March 29, 1926 (valid until 1952) and Art. 2 of copyright law of July 10, 1952 of the People's Republic of Poland, all photographs by Polish photographers (or published for the first time in Poland or simultaneously in Poland and abroad) printed without a clear copyright notice before the law was changed on May 23, 1994 are public domain. Status of those photographs did not change after Polish Copyright Law of February 4, 1994 was enacted. (See: Template:PD-Polish)

According to the Polish Copyright Law of February 4, 1994 (Article 4, case 2) "governmental symbols, documents, materials and signs are not subject to copyrights". However, in some instances the use of this image in Poland might be regulated by other laws. It is being debated if postage stamps fall into this category. (See: Template:PD-Polishsymbol)

According to the Art.21 of copyright law of March 29, 1926 (valid until 1952) photographs lose copyright protection ten years after picture was taken. Series of scientific or artistic pictures lose copyright protection after 50 years. According to Art. 27 of copyright law of July 10, 1952 (valid until May 23, 1994) photographs and  series of photographs lose copyright protection ten years after publication date.

The copyright act from February 4, 1994 in article 33 point 1 allows the propagation of works that are permanently exhibited on the publicly accessible roads, streets, squares or gardens provided that the propagation is not for the same use. The name of the creator and source should be provided if it is possible by article 34. This use is royalty free, provided that it does not harm the legitimate interests of the creator by article 34.

Polish copyright law prohibits copyright for:
 legislative acts and their official drafts,
 official documents, materials, logos and symbols,
 published patent specifications and industrial design specifications,
 simple press information.

See also
Copyright
Public domain
Wikipedia:Copyright
Wikipedia:Public domain

External links

Protecting Intellectual Property in Poland
Freedom of panorama in Poland

Poland
Polish intellectual property law